Raphsonian was a region and family of the old Armenia c. 400–800.

The rulers about 451 were Babik and Iukhnan (or Ohan) Raphsonian.

See also
List of regions of old Armenia

Early medieval Armenian regions